Dhurakij Pundit University (thurakit translates to "business", bandit to "scholar") is a university in Bangkok, Thailand. Founded as Dhurakij Pundit College in 1968, and upgraded to university status in 1984, it is one of the larger Thai private universities. Undergraduate and graduate degree programs are offered through the university's nine faculties, the graduate school, and the international college.

International affiliations and partnerships
DPU has affiliations with universities in Australia, the United States, the People's Republic of China, Japan, Canada, France and Sweden. INO is responsible for setting up international exchange programs for both the staff and students.

References

External links
 International College (DPUIC)

1968 establishments in Thailand
Universities and colleges in Bangkok
Educational institutions established in 1968
Private universities and colleges in Thailand
Universities in Thailand
Universities established in the 1980s